The following is an alphabetical list of all active professional sumo wrestlers in the top makuuchi division, and all those currently in lower divisions who have a Wikipedia article. Please refer to professional sumo divisions for more information about the separate divisions.

List

See also
List of past sumo wrestlers
List of non-Japanese sumo wrestlers
List of sumo elders
List of sumo record holders
List of sumo tournament top division champions
List of sumo tournament second division champions
List of sumo stables
List of years in sumo
List of yokozuna

External links
Current banzuke at Japan Sumo Association

Lists of sumo wrestlers

See also
List of past sumo wrestlers
List of non-Japanese sumo wrestlers
List of sumo elders
List of sumo record holders
List of sumo tournament top division champions
List of sumo tournament second division champions
List of sumo stables
List of years in sumo
List of yokozuna

External links
Current banzuke at Japan Sumo Association

Lists of sumo wrestlers